Dame Rachel Elizabeth Waterhouse  (2 January 1923 – 14 October 2020) was an English local historian, consumer affairs activist and writer.

Biography
Rachel Franklin was born in Whitchurch, Somerset, the daughter of Percival Franklin, a loss adjuster, and his wife Ruby (née Knight). The family relocated to Birmingham while she was a child.  Rachel won a scholarship to King Edward VI High School for Girls in the city, then an exhibition to study history at St Hugh's College, Oxford, graduating in 1944. After the Second World War she returned to Birmingham where she married John Waterhouse, a university lecturer, in 1947.  In 1950 she completed a PhD at the University of Birmingham.

Historian 
Waterhouse became a founder member of The Victorian Society in 1958 and was instrumental in setting up the Birmingham Branch in 1967, serving as its first Chairman between 1967 and 1971.

She was a member of the group which resurrected the Lunar Society around 1990 and became its founder Chairman.

She was president of the Birmingham and Midland Institute for 1992.

Consumers' Association
Waterhouse was a council member of the Consumers' Association from 1966 and its chairman from 1982 to 1990.  She was also a member of the National Consumer Council and of the Health and Safety Commission.

Honours
Waterhouse was made a Commander of the Most Excellent Order of the British Empire (CBE) in 1980 and a Dame Commander of the Most Excellent Order of the British Empire (DBE) in 1990.
 
She received honorary degrees from Aston University, the University of Birmingham and Loughborough University.

Death
Waterhouse died in October 2020 at the age of 97. Her husband predeceased her in 2000.  She was survived by her children, Matthew, Edmund, Deborah and Rebecca, eight grandchildren and three great-grandchildren.

Written works
The Birmingham and Midland Institute, 1854–1954
Children in Hospital: a hundred years of child care in Birmingham 
A Hundred Years of Engineering Craftsmanship: a short history tracing the adventurous development of Tangye's Limited, Smethwick, 1857–1957
King Edward VI High School for Girls, 1883–1983
Six King Edward Schools, 1883–1983
The 1990s and a Christian Response to Consumerism
The Birmingham and Midland Institute: the Institute's contributions to Birmingham, 1855–2005
Joint authorship:
How Birmingham became a Great City (jointly with John Whybrow)
Birmingham One Hundred Years Ago: social and political life and cultural life (jointly with Charles Parish)

References

1923 births
2020 deaths
British activists
British historians
British women activists
Dames Commander of the Order of the British Empire
People from Birmingham, West Midlands
Alumni of St Hugh's College, Oxford
Alumni of the University of Birmingham